Reinhard Pfundt (born in 1951) is a German pianist, composer and academic teacher at the University of Music and Theatre Leipzig. He wrote orchestral works, chamber music and songs, and was awarded prizes in the German Democratic Republic (DDR).

Life 
Born in Burgstädt, Pfundt grew up with weekly  singing and lessons in piano and organ. He received first composition lessons from 1967 to 1969 with Paul Kurzbach in Chemnitz (then Karl-Marx-Stadt). From 1969 to 1975, he studied composition and piano at the Musikhochschule Leipzig, among others with Fritz Geißler, Rolf Reuter, Siegfried Thiele and Wilhelm Weismann. Afterwards he was master student of Siegfried Matthus at the Berlin Academy of Arts.

Pfundt worked as a freelance composer and pianist until 1987, and simultaneously lectured at Musikhochschule Leipzig and in Halle. He then became senior assistant (Oberassistent) in Leipzig. His De profundis was premiered in 1981 for the opening weeks of the new Gewandhaus, conducted by Kurt Masur. In 1992, Pfundt was appointed professor of composition and Tonsatz at the institution, now called  University of Music and Theatre "Felix Mendelssohn Bartholdy". He served as Prorector of the university from 1994 to 2000. He retired in 2016.

Awards 
 1978 Prize at the DDR Musiktage festival, for Sonata for viola solo
 1980 Hans Stieber Prize.
 1984  for Bartók-Reflexionen für Orchester.
 1986 Hanns-Eisler-Preis for Inventionen zu BACH. 1985
 1985 Prize of the Thüringer Landeskirche.
 1992 Prize of the Carl-Engels-Stiftung.

Composition 
Pfundt composed orchestral works, chamber music and songs, including:

Orchestra 
 Bartók-Reflexionen
 De profundis
 Introduktion und Kanon
 Inventionen zu BACH
 Flute Concerto
 Concerto for orchestra
 Musique pour Sanssouci

Chamber music 
 Auf der Suche nach dem Gleichgewicht for flute, violin and piano
 Ballade für Violine und Harfe.
 Wind Quiotet
 Capriccio, Canto e Canone for flute and clarinet
 Three Etudes for piano
 Three Pieces for horn
 Three Pieces for oboe and viola.
 Three Pieces for oboe and percussion.
 Three pieces for violin and piano
 Fantasia on Luther's Agnus Dei for organ
 Five Pieces for piano
 In die Tiefe, Collage for soprano recorder, violin, cello, double bass and harpsichord
 Inventions on B-A-C-H for piano
 Serenade for flute, alto flute (or violin) and cello.
 Sextett for flute, clarinet, bassoon, violin, viola and cello
 Sonate for viola sola
 Four String Quartets
 Suite for three flute instruments
 Trio for flute, viola and cello
 Triosonata for organ
 Vertiefung in ein Thema von Bach for flute, two violins, cello, double bass and harpsichord
 Four Pieces for piano
 Four Monograms for alto recorder

Vocal music 
 Five songs for mezzo-soprano, horn and piano, text by Eva Strittmatter
 Nine Galgenlieder, songs for mixed choir, text by Christian Morgenstern
 Seven songs for mezzo-soprano, flute and harp, text by Morgenstern
 Two songs for voice and piano, text by Friedrich Hagedorn
 Two madrigals for mixed choir, texts by Paul von der Aelst and Thibault

References

External links 
 
 Katalog beim Verlag Schirmer
 Compositions on Wise Music Classical
 Vortrag von Professor Pfundt in der Stadtbibliothek: "Anfang und Ende"? / Bezüge zu Bach und Wagner in eigenen Kompositionen} (in German) Wagner Association Leipzig
 Plädoyer für den ganzen Klinger (in German) Wagner Foundation Leipzig, July 2011
 

21st-century German composers

Living people

20th-century German composers
1951 births
People from Burgstädt